Murat Seropian (born 26 October 1970) is a Greek football manager and former player.

References

1970 births
Living people
Greek people of Armenian descent
Armenian emigrants to Greece
Armenian footballers
Greek footballers
Association football defenders
PAS Giannina F.C. players
AO Chania F.C. players
Agios Nikolaos F.C. players
Atromitos F.C. players
Marko F.C. players
Fostiras F.C. players
Panelefsiniakos F.C. players
Vyzas F.C. players
Greek football managers
Vyzas F.C. managers
Panachaiki F.C. managers
A.O. Glyfada F.C. managers
AO Chania F.C. managers
Panegialios F.C. managers
OFI Crete F.C. managers
Ethnikos Piraeus F.C. managers
Doxa Vyronas F.C. players